Sheykh Ahmad (also Romanized as Sheykh Aḩmad) is a village in Gharbi Rural District, in the Central District of Ardabil County, Ardabil Province, Iran. At the 2006 census, its population was 731, in 136 families.

References 

Towns and villages in Ardabil County